Kilifi North Constituency is an electoral constituency in Kenya. It is one of seven constituencies in Kilifi County. It came to be from the former Bahari Constituency which was split into two by the IEBC Act. 

The constituency has administrative seven wards with elected representative Members of County Assembly at the County Assembly of Kilifi. These wards are
Tezo
Sokoni 
Kibarani
Dabaso
Matsangoni 
Watamu 
Mnarani

References
 

Constituencies in Kilifi County
Constituencies in Coast Province
2013 establishments in Kenya
Constituencies established in 2013